Marius Papšys (born 13 May 1989, in Klaipėda, Lithuania) is a Lithuanian footballer who plays as a right winger for FK Saned Joniškis.

Club career
In 2006, Papšys signed for second tier Lithuanian side FK Vilnius. During his time there, he was loaned out to Interas-AE Visaginas where he made 16 appearances.

In 2009, he signed with Russian side FC Amkar Perm, but he only managed to make the reserves side. Shortly after, he signed with his hometown club FK Klaipėda where he scored two goals in 19 games.

In 2010, he transferred to Gambrinus liga side 1. FK Příbram where he played for the following two and a half seasons.

On 27 February 2017, Papšys agreed with Lithuanian A Lyga team Stumbras. He left the club after three months.

International career
On 7 June 2011 Papšys made his debut for the Lithuania national football team in a friendly match against Norway.

References 

1989 births
Living people
Sportspeople from Klaipėda
Lithuanian footballers
Lithuania international footballers
Lithuania under-21 international footballers
Association football midfielders
A Lyga players
FC Vilnius players
Interas-AE Visaginas players
FK Sirijus Klaipėda players
FK Atlantas players
FK Klaipėdos Granitas players
FC Stumbras players
Russian Premier League players
FC Amkar Perm players
Czech First League players
1. FK Příbram players
FC Džiugas players
Liga I players
Sepsi OSK Sfântu Gheorghe players
Lithuanian expatriate footballers
Expatriate footballers in Russia
Lithuanian expatriate sportspeople in Russia
Expatriate footballers in the Czech Republic
Lithuanian expatriate sportspeople in the Czech Republic
Expatriate footballers in Romania
Lithuanian expatriate sportspeople in Romania